The Man Upstairs may refer to:

Books and literature
The Man Upstairs (short story collection), a 1914 short story collection by P. G. Wodehouse
"The Man Upstairs", a 1943 short story by Ray Bradbury from The October Country
The Man Upstairs, a 1953 novel by Patrick Hamilton
"The babysitter and the man upstairs", a 1960s urban legend
The Man Upstairs, a 1995 short story by Carolyn Banks

Film
The Man Upstairs (1926 film), based on The Agony Column by Earl Derr Biggers 
The Man Upstairs (1958 film), starring Richard Attenborough 
The Man Upstairs (1992 film), starring Katharine Hepburn and Ryan O'Neal
The Man Upstairs, a human character from The Lego Movie and The Lego Movie 2: The Second Part

Music
The Man Upstairs, a 2002 album by Richie Stephens
The Man Upstairs (album), a 2014 album by Robyn Hitchcock

Other uses
God, when thought of as being in heaven above Earth
Roommate